The Art Guys (Michael Galbreth (born 1956 in Philadelphia, Pennsylvania, died 2019 in Houston, Texas) and Jack Massing (born 1959 in Buffalo, New York) are a collaborative artist team based in Houston, Texas.

History
The Art Guys have worked together since 1983 after meeting while students at the University of Houston. For the exploration of their ideas, they employ a wide variety of media including sculpture, drawing, performances, installations and video. Food, drugs, pencils, baseball bats, car lot flags, toothbrushes and matches are among the unconventional materials they have used.

Described in the New York Times as "a cross between Dada, David Letterman, John Cage and the Smothers Brothers," The Art Guys present a blend of performance, conceptual and visual art that explores the absurdities of contemporary life.

They have received Artadia Awards in both 2004 and 2006.

Not artists 
The Art Guys became "not artists" on April 1, 2016 at 12:05 am after 33 years of collaboration.  Hallelujah! the blind can see again; the water's fine.

Solo exhibitions

The Art Guys have shown in the following solo exhibitions:  

2015-“The Tunnel of Love”, One Allen Center, Houston, Texas
2015-“Some Conceptions”, Gensler, Houston, Texas
2014-“Nullities and Vacuities”, Kimura Gallery, University of Alaska-Anchorage, Anchorage, Alaska
2014-“Scattershot”, Wynne Home Arts Center, Huntsville, Texas
2012-“The State of Texas v. Gary Sweeney v. The Art Guys”, Unit B Gallery, San Antonio, Texas
2012-“Funny Space”, organized by Snack Projects, The Menil Collection Bookstore, Houston, Texas
2011-“The Art Guys: Right Before Your Eyes”, Bradbury Gallery, Arkansas State University, Jonesboro, Arkansas
2011-“Idle Chatter”, Space 204, Vanderbilt University, Nashville, Tennessee
2011-“The Meronomic Antinomy of the Transfinite Realm (She's a Brick House)”, The Wrong Again Gallery, Memphis, Tennessee
2009-“New Clichés”, McClain Gallery, Houston, Texas
2009-“The Art Guys: Bag of Tricks”, Ben Bailey Art Gallery, Texas A&M University-Kingsville, Kingsville, Texas
2007-“The Art Guys: Cloud Cuckoo Land Selections from 25 Years of Drawings, Proposals, Failed Schemes and Pipe  Dreams”, Galveston Art Center, Galveston, Texas (traveling exhibition)
2007-“The Art Guys: Seeing Double”, Tampa Museum of Art, Tampa, Florida
2007-“Two guys walk into a hardware store...”, Galleri Andersson Sandstrom, Umeå, Sweden
2007-“White Wash” (The Art Guys with That's Painting Productions), l’ecole du BAOUM, Grenoble, France
2006-“Two guys walk into a hardware store...”, Birke Art Gallery, Huntington, West Virginia
2006-“The Art Guys: Nothing To It”, Beeville Art Museum, Beeville, Texas
2005-“The Art Guys: Food For Thought”, Art League of Houston, Houston, Texas
2004-“Reality TV: A New Series”, Marfa Book Company, Marfa, Texas
2004-“America's Greatest Artists”, Galerie Stefan Andersson, Umeå, Sweden
2003-“What's The Big Idea?”, Cornell DeWitt Gallery, New York, New York
2002-“The Art Guys: Sweet And Sour”, (in conjunction with FotoFest 2002) Central Market, Houston, Texas
2002-“Serenity”, Sawhill Gallery, James Madison University, Harrisonburg, Virginia
2001-“Once Is Not Enough”, Redbud Gallery, Houston, Texas
2001-“Once Is Not Enough - Again”, Cornell DeWitt Gallery, New York, New York
2001-“SUITS: The Clothes Make The Man”, The Museum of Fine Arts-Houston, Houston, Texas
2001-“Laughing Building”, Masonic Lodge, Marfa, Texas
2000-“Tunnel of Love”, Sala Diaz, San Antonio, Texas
1999-“The Art Guys Again and Again”, Tacoma Art Museum, Tacoma, Washington
1999-“Kit and Caboodle”, Scottsdale Museum of Contemporary Art (SMoCA), Scottsdale, Arizona
1999-“The Art Guys: An Exhibition of New Work”, Barry Whistler Gallery, Dallas, Texas
1998-“Business As Unusual”, Southeastern Center for Contemporary Art (SECCA), Winston-Salem, North Carolina
1998-“Common Nonsense”, De Saisset Museum, Santa Clara, California
1998-“Call of the Wild”, Columbus State University, Columbus, Georgia
1997-“The Great Hunting And Fishing Expo”, Braunstein/Quay Gallery, San Francisco, California
1997-“seeing the elephant”, Hallwalls Contemporary Arts Center, Buffalo, New York
1997-“Hunting And Gathering”, Halsey Gallery, College of Charleston, Charleston, South Carolina
1997-“Wildlife”, Austin Museum of Art, Laguna Gloria, Austin, Texas
1996-“The Great Outdoors”, Lynn Goode Gallery, Houston, Texas
1996-“The Art Guys: Goods and Services”, Blue Star Art Space, San Antonio, Texas
1996-“Visualize The Art Guys”, Kemper Museum of Contemporary Art and Design, Kansas City, Missouri
1995-“The Art Guys: Think Twice”, Contemporary Arts Museum-Houston, Texas (catalog, traveled to the Tyler Museum of Art, Tyler, Texas
1995-“The Art Guys Variety Show”, Braunstein/Quay Gallery, San Francisco, California
1995-“The Fan Array (And Other New Work)”, Capp Street Project, San Francisco, California
1995-“The Game Show”, Barry Whistler Gallery, Dallas, Texas
1994-“Good and Plenty”, Lesikar Gallery, Houston, Texas
1994-“Today's Special”, Palomar Restaurant, Houston, Texas (catalog)
1993-“Something From Nothing”, UAA Gallery, University of Alaska-Anchorage
1993-“Art Guise”, Janie Beggs Gallery, Aspen, Colorado
1993-“Those Art Guys Again”, Barry Whistler Gallery, Dallas, Texas
1992-“Group Show”, 0-1 Gallery, Los Angeles, California
1991-“AAAArt Guys”, Barry Whistler Gallery, Dallas, Texas
1991-“Art Guys”, Gallery 3, Huntington, West Virginia
1990-“Art Guys”, Barry Whistler Gallery, Dallas, Texas
1989-“Talking Pictures: The Art Guys at Full Tilt”, Sonic Arts Gallery, San Diego, California
1989-“don't get left behind get right behind”, San Jacinto College, Houston, Texas
1986-“Mustaches For Seattle: Sea/Hou-Hou/Sea”, 911, Seattle, Washington
1985-Untitled Installation, Butler Gallery, Houston, Texas
1985-“Particles”, Midtown Art Center, Houston, Texas
1983-“GMAALSBSRIENTGH”, Studio One, Houston, Texas

Selected group exhibitions
Notable group shows include: 
2012-“Western Sequels, Art from the Lone Star State”, Athens School of Fine Arts, Athens, Greece, traveled to Mimar Sinan Fine Arts University, Istanbul, Turkey
2009-“No Zoning: Artists Engage Houston”, Contemporary Arts Museum, Houston, Texas
2007-"Duiying–Yingdui – Corresponding & Responding”, curated by James Surls, National Art Museum of China, Beijing, China
2007-“40 Years of Public Art in New York City Parks”, The Arsenal Gallery, Arsenal, Central Park, New York, New York
2006-Texas In China”, Shanghai Museum, Shanghai, China
1993-“Here's Looking At Me”, Espace Lyonnais D’Art Contemporain, Lyon, France (catalog)
1992-"Flux Attitudes," The New Museum of Contemporary Art, New York, New York (catalog)
1989-"Project Diomede," The Clocktower, P.S.1, New York, New York

Selected bibliography
 The Art Guys:  Cloud Cuckoo Land (Selections from 25 Years of Drawings, Proposals, Failed Schemes and Pipe Dreams).  Galveston, Texas, Galveston Arts Center, 2007.
 Creative Time: The Book.  New York, New York, 2006.
 Houston Contemporary Art. Shanghai, Shanghai Art Museum, 2006.
 Suits: The Clothes Make the Man.  New York, New York: Harry N. Abrams, Inc., 2000.
 Guinness World Records 2000 Millennium Edition, Britain: Guinness World Records, Ltd., 2000.
 The Art Guys Think Twice.  New York, New York: Harry N. Abrams, Inc., 1995.
 Autoportraits Contemporains: Here's Looking At Me. Lyons, France: Espace Lyonnaise d’art Contemporain, 1993.
 FluxAttitudes.  New York, New York: The New Museum of Contemporary Art, 1991.

References

External links
 The Art Guys official website

University of Houston alumni
American artist groups and collectives
American conceptual artists
American performance artists
Artists from Texas